Wang Nuea is a tambon (subdistrict) of Wang Nuea District, in Lampang Province, Thailand. In 2016 it had a population of 6,963 people.

Administration

Central administration
The tambon is subdivided into nine administrative villages (mubans).

Local administration
The area of the subdistrict is shared by three local governments.
the subdistrict municipality (Thesaban Tambon) Ban Mai (เทศบาลตำบลบ้านใหม่)
the subdistrict municipality (Thesaban Tambon) Wang Nuea (เทศบาลตำบลวังเหนือ)
the subdistrict administrative organization (SAO) Wang Nuea (องค์การบริหารส่วนตำบลวังเหนือ)

References

External links
Thaitambon.com on Wang Nuea

Tambon of Lampang province
Populated places in Lampang province